Petra Karin Kelly (29 November 1947 –  1 October 1992) was a German Green politician and ecofeminist activist. She was a founding member of the German Green Party, the first Green party to rise to prominence both nationally in Germany and worldwide. In 1982, she was awarded the Right Livelihood Award for "forging and implementing a new vision uniting ecological concerns with disarmament, social justice and human rights."

Early life and education 

Petra Karin Lehmann was born in Günzburg, Bavaria (then the American Zone of Occupation, Germany), in 1947. She changed her name to Kelly after her mother married John E. Kelly, a US Army officer. She was educated in a Roman Catholic convent in Günzburg and later attended school in Georgia and Virginia after her family relocated to the United States in 1959. She lived and studied in the United States until her return to West Germany in 1970. She retained her West German citizenship throughout her life.

Kelly admired Martin Luther King Jr., and campaigned for Robert F. Kennedy and Hubert Humphrey in the 1968 U.S. elections. She studied political science at the School of International Service at American University (Washington, D.C.), from which she graduated in 1970 with a bachelor's degree. She also graduated from the European Institute at the University of Amsterdam in 1971 with a master's degree.

Career 

While working at the European Commission (Brussels, Belgium, 1971–83), Kelly participated in numerous peace and environmental campaigns in Germany and other countries.

After working for two years at the European Commission, she moved to an administrative post at the Economic and Social Committee, where she championed women's rights.

German Green Party 

Kelly was one of the founders of Die Grünen, the German Green Party in 1979. In 1983 she was elected to the Bundestag via the Electoral list as a Member of the Bundestag representing Bavaria. She was subsequently re-elected in 1987 with a higher share of the vote.

In 1981, Kelly was involved in a protest of 400,000 people in Bonn against nuclear weapons. In 1982, Gerhard Schröder wrote a contribution in Die Zeit for the book Prinzip Leben, edited by Kelly and Jo Leinen, which discussed ecological problems and a possible nuclear war.

In the same year, Kelly received the Right Livelihood Award "...for forging and implementing a new vision uniting ecological concerns with disarmament, social justice, and human rights."

On 12 May 1983, Kelly, Gert Bastian and three other Green Bundestag members unfurled a banner on Alexanderplatz in East Berlin, which said "The Greens – Swords to Ploughshares". After being briefly arrested, they met with East German opposition parties. The East German authorities tolerated this since the West German Greens repudiated the NATO Double-Track Decision. In October 1983, Erich Honecker, the leader of the German Democratic Republic, met Petra Kelly, Gert Bastian and other Greens. Kelly wore a pullover with the words "Swords to Ploughshares" on it. She demanded the release of all prisoners of the East German peace movement and asked Honecker why he repressed something in the GDR which he supported in the West.

Kelly wrote the book Fighting for Hope in 1984, published by South End Press. The book is an urgent call for a world free from violence between North and South, men and women, ourselves and our environment.

In the final years of her life, Kelly became increasingly estranged from most of her party colleagues owing to the pragmatic turn taken by the Greens at the time, while she continued to oppose any alliance with traditional political parties.

Death 

On 19 October 1992, the decomposed bodies of Kelly and her partner, ex-general and Green politician Gert Bastian (born 1923), were discovered in the bedroom of her house in Bonn by police officials after they received a call from both Bastian's wife and Kelly's grandmother who reported that they had not heard from either Bastian or Kelly for a few weeks. The police determined that Kelly was shot dead while sleeping by Bastian, who then killed himself. She was 44, he was 69.  The last time anyone heard from the couple was on 30 September 1992 when Kelly sent a parcel to her grandmother. Police estimated the deaths had most likely occurred on 1 October but the exact time of death could not be pinpointed owing to the delay in finding the bodies and their resultant state of decomposition. Kelly was buried in the Waldfriedhof (forest cemetery) in Würzburg, near the village of Heidingsfeld in Lower Franconia, Bavaria.

Honors 

 1982: Right Livelihood Award
In 2006 Kelly was placed 45th in the UK Environment Agency's all-time list of scientists, campaigners, writers, economists and naturalists who, in its view, have done the most to save the planet. Kelly was positioned between the tropical ecologist Mike Hands and the national parks visionary John Dower.

Works 

Kelly, Petra K. Thinking Green! Essays on Environmentalism, Feminism, and Nonviolence, Parallax Press, Berkeley, California, 1994
Kelly, Petra K. Nonviolence Speaks to Power, online book, almost complete text (also, out of print, published by Matsunaga Institute for Peace, University of Hawaii, 1992)

Portrayals 

Happiness is a Warm Gun, 2001 film by Thomas Imbach
Petra, 2020 novel by Shaena Lambert

See also 

 List of peace activists

References

Further reading 

 Bevan, Ruth A. "Petra Kelly: The Other Green." New Political Science 23.2 (2001): 181-202.
 
 Mellor, Mary. "Green politics: ecofeminist, ecofeminine or ecomasculine?." Environmental Politics 1.2 (1992): 229-251.
 Milder, Stephen. "Thinking globally, acting (trans-) locally: Petra Kelly and the transnational roots of West German green politics." Central European History 43.2 (2010): 301-326. online

 
 Richter, Saskia. "Petra Kelly, International Green Leader: On biography and the peace movement as resources of power in West German politics, 1979-1983." German Politics and Society 33.4 (2015): 80-96.
 
 White, Brion. "Petra Kelly And Dorothy Day: Peace Activists Working Inside and Outside the Traditional Government Structure for Social Change." Journal for Peace and Justice Studies 23.2 (2013): 117-138.
 Wilsford, David, ed. Political leaders of contemporary Western Europe: A biographical dictionary (Greenwood, 1995) pp. 230–236.

External links 

Curriculum Vitae with picture
Happiness is a Warm Gun. Film on Petra Kelly's death
Right Livelihood Award website
Petra Kelly Archives at the Heinrich Böll Foundation
Petra Kelly Prize for human rights, ecology and non-violence
BBC Radio 4 – Great Lives, Series 24, Petra Kelly, mp3-Audio (30 mins, 13 MB)

1947 births
1992 deaths
People from Günzburg
Social Democratic Party of Germany politicians
Members of the Bundestag for Bavaria
German Peace Society members
Pacifist feminists
American University School of International Service alumni
Nonviolence advocates
German activists
German women activists
Ecofeminists
German essayists
German feminists
German political writers
Green thinkers
Non-fiction environmental writers
German anti–nuclear weapons activists
Hampton High School (Virginia) alumni
Female members of the Bundestag
Tibet freedom activists
Political party founders
German murder victims
People murdered in Germany
20th-century German women politicians
20th-century essayists
Members of the Bundestag for Alliance 90/The Greens